Maurice Quentin (Maizières-les-Metz, 2 June 1920 – 19 April 2013) was a French professional road bicycle racer.

Major results

1945
GP du Débarquement Nord
1946
GP Courrier Picard
1947
Nouan-le-Fuzelier
1949
Tour du Calvados
Paris - Clermont-Ferrand
1950
Pont-l'Abbé
1952
Circuit des Boucles de la Seine
1953
Tour de France:
Winner stage 15
1956
Lannion
1957
GP d'Espéraza
Circuit des Hautes-Vosges

References

External links 

Official Tour de France results for Maurice Quentin

French male cyclists
1920 births
2013 deaths
French Tour de France stage winners
Sportspeople from Moselle (department)
Cyclists from Grand Est